The World Ladies Classic was a women's professional golf tournament on the Ladies European Tour that took place in Malaysia. It was only held in 1993 near Kuala Lumpur.

The tournament was held 14–17 January with a purse of $300,000 and was the season opener of the 1993 Ladies European Tour. One caddie collapsed and two players, Susan Elliott and Jennifer Allmark, had to withdraw due to excessive heat. 

Karen Lunn won after Sandrine Mendiburu made a double bogey on the second playoff hole.

Winners

Source:

References

External links
Ladies European Tour

Former Ladies European Tour events
Golf tournaments in Malaysia